Flyin' High is the second album by the American Southern rock band Blackfoot, released in 1976.

Track listing

Personnel

Band members 
 Rickey Medlocke – lead vocals, guitars
 Charlie Hargrett – guitars
 Greg T. Walker – bass guitar, keyboards, guitar on "Mother", backing vocals
 Jakson Spires – drums, percussion, backing vocals

Additional musicians 
 Suzy Storm, Laura Struzick – backing vocals

Production 
 Producers: David Hood, Jimmy Johnson
 Engineers: Greg Hamm, Jerry Masters
 Mixed by Steve Melton
 Mastered by George Marino
 Design: Andy Engel
 Photography by Arthur Maillet, Teresa Alfieri

References

External links 
 Blackfoot - Flyin' High (1976) album review by Eduardo Rivadavia, credits & releases at AllMusic.com
 Blackfoot - Flyin' High (1976) album releases & credits at Discogs.com
 Blackfoot - Flyin' High (1976) album to be listened as stream at Spotify.com

Blackfoot (band) albums
1976 albums
Epic Records albums
Albums recorded at Muscle Shoals Sound Studio